Albert Kakou Tiapani (c. September 27, 1944 – September 9, 2021) was an Ivorian politician. A member of the Democratic Party of Ivory Coast – African Democratic Rally, he served as Minister of Housing and Urban Planning under the second government of Daniel Kablan Duncan.

References

1944 births
2021 deaths
Year of birth uncertain
20th-century Ivorian politicians
Government ministers of Ivory Coast
Democratic Party of Côte d'Ivoire – African Democratic Rally politicians
People from Lagunes District